Out of This World is the sole album led by American jazz saxophonist Walter Benton which was recorded in 1960 for the Jazzland label.

Reception

The Allmusic site awarded the album 3 stars.

Track listing
All compositions by Walter Benton except as indicated
 "Out of This World" (Harold Arlen, Johnny Mercer) - 5:43  
 "Walter's Altar" - 8:26 
 "Iris" - 5:24  
 "Night Movements" - 2:43  
 "A Blues Mood" - 7:30  
 "Azil" - 4:36  
 "Lover Man" (Jimmy Davis, Ram Ramirez, James Sherman) - 8:45

Personnel 

Walter Benton - tenor saxophone
Freddie Hubbard - trumpet (tracks 1, 2, 4 & 6)
Wynton Kelly - piano 
Paul Chambers - bass
Jimmy Cobb (tracks 1, 2, 4 & 6), Albert Heath (tracks 3, 5 & 7) - drums

References 

1960 albums
Walter Benton albums
Jazzland Records (1960) albums
Albums produced by Orrin Keepnews